Gargoyles is a fictional team of characters appearing in comic book series by Slave Labor Graphics and Creature Comics which appeared between 2006 and 2009.  It was based on the 1994 animated television series Gargoyles, and was written by series co-creator Greg Weisman.  The comic continued the storyline of the first two seasons, but ignores much of the third season,  The Goliath Chronicles. 

Dynamite Entertainment will remaster and republish these comics in 2023. A new line of comics serves as Season 4 of the show, again written and overseen by Greg Weisman, with issue 1 releasing on December 7, 2022.

Storyline
The comic acted as a continuation of the animated series after episode 65, picking up after the climactic second season finale, "Hunter's Moon, Part III". The first two issues of the comic translate episode 66 "The Journey", which was the only third season Gargoyles episode Weisman considers to be canonical (as well as the only third season episode Weisman wrote).  Issue #3 of the Gargoyles comic then began a completely new storyline, which deliberately ignored the rest of the events of the televised third season.  

Weisman has confirmed that the in-universe timeline of the comic starts in 1996, just after the conclusion of the final episode of the series' second season. Issue #10 was the first issue set in 1997.

Production
In June 2005, it was announced that a series of Disney-licensed, bi-monthly Gargoyles comic books would be created by Slave Labor Graphics in association with CreatureComics. Gargoyles #1 was released on June 21, 2006 and promptly sold out, ensuring a second printing. After an extended delay, Gargoyles #2 was released on December 13, 2006. Issue #6 contains an error: the artwork on page 12 and 16 was switched, even though the text is correct. Slave Labor has acknowledged this error, and the corrected issue was reprinted on November 14.

Greg Guler, character designer for the original TV series, and Stephanie Lostimolo have produced the cover art for each issue. Story art is primarily being produced by David Hedgecock and colored by Dustin Evans, although issues #4, #5, and #6 were drawn by guest artists. Gargoyles #6 used the unpublished script that Weisman wrote for the Marvel series.

In August 2008, Greg Weisman announced that, due to Disney increasing its licensing fees, Slave Labor Graphics would not be renewing its license of Gargoyles after it ran out on August 31, 2008. The final two issues of Bad Guys and four of Gargoyles were released in the comic trades collecting both series in August 2009. Weisman also stated that SLG President Dan Vado has not given up on the Gargoyles franchise, and hopes to pursue the idea of Gargoyles graphic novels in the future.

Spin-offs
One of Greg Weisman's planned Gargoyles spin-offs, Bad Guys, appeared as a black-and-white six-issue limited series in 2007/08. The first issue was released on November 28, 2007. The series was written by Weisman and drawn by Karine Charlebois, with cover art by Greg Guler and Stephanie Lostimolo.

Had the comics continued, Gargoyles: Pendragon would have been next in line, followed by Gargoyles: Timedancer. Each of these would have also appeared as a six-issue black-and-white limited series.

Issues
Note that Gargoyles issues #9–12 and Bad Guys issues #5–6 were only published in the collections.

Gargoyles (Slave Labor Graphics)

Gargoyles: Bad Guys

Gargoyles (Dynamite)

Collections

Reception
The SLG series was met with positive reviews, with many readers saying they wished the series did not end after only 12 issues.

Awards

References

External links
Save the Gargoyles Comic!...And Other Gargoyles News
Gargoyles Comic Interview with Weisman – March, 2006
Wondercon 2007 Panel Greg Weisman – March 4, 2007
GREG WEISMAN TALKS "THE AMAZING SPIDER-MAN" & "GARGOYLES" – March 8, 2007
 Greg Weisman's interview on BAD GUYS & GARGOYLES comic books – October 2, 2007
Charlebois' BAD GUYS & GARGOYLES – October 18, 2007
 Greg Weisman discusses the new Gargoyles comic series – July, 2008

Comics based on television series
Disney Comics titles
Disney comics titles
Gargoyles (TV series)
Comics about time travel